Erik Reitz (born July 29, 1982) is an American former professional ice hockey player, known as an enforcer, who played in the National Hockey League (NHL) with the Minnesota Wild and the New York Rangers.

Playing career
Reitz was drafted 170th overall in the 2000 NHL Entry Draft by the Minnesota Wild from the Barrie Colts of the Ontario Hockey League. He plays defense, and has also spent six seasons with the Houston Aeros of the American Hockey League (AHL). He made his NHL debut with the Wild in the 2005–06 season, playing in 5 games.

Reitz made the Wild roster for the 2008–09 season and played in 31 games before he was traded by the Wild to the New York Rangers in exchange for Dan Fritsche on January 29, 2009. After 11 games with the Rangers, Erik was claimed off waivers by the Toronto Maple Leafs on March 4, 2009. Reitz never debuted for the Leafs after suffering a season-ending ankle injury on March 7, 2009.

On August 22, 2009, Reitz signed with Sibir Novosibirsk of the KHL. After a single season in Russia, Reitz left to sign a one-year contract for EC Red Bull Salzburg of Austria on November 10, 2010. Lacking match conditioning, Reitz trained with Salzburg for under a month before he was released without making his debut. Reitz returned to Salzburg the following 2011–12 season, appearing in 19 games for 1 assist before he was mutually released from his contract on January 30, 2012.

Career statistics

Regular season and playoffs

International

Awards and honors

References

External links

1982 births
Living people
American men's ice hockey defensemen
Barrie Colts players
American expatriate ice hockey players in Russia
HC Sibir Novosibirsk players
Houston Aeros (1994–2013) players
Ice hockey people from Detroit
Minnesota Wild draft picks
Minnesota Wild players
New York Rangers players
EC Red Bull Salzburg players